Pradeep Nandrajog (born 24 February 1958) is an Indian Judge. He is former Chief Justice of Bombay High Court and also former Chief Justice of Rajasthan High Court and Judge of Delhi High Court.

Career
He was appointed the Chief Justice of Bombay High Court on 7 April 2019, and is now retired.

References

Judges of the Delhi High Court
Living people
21st-century Indian judges
Chief Justices of the Rajasthan High Court
Chief Justices of the Bombay High Court
Delhi University alumni
1958 births